Nova Ushytsia is an urban-type settlement in Kamianets-Podilskyi Raion, Khmelnytskyi Oblast of western Ukraine. It hosts the administration of Nova Ushytsia settlement hromada, one of the hromadas of Ukraine. The settlement's population was 4,557 as of the 2001 Ukrainian Census and 

It is located in the historical region of Podolia.

The settlement was first founded in 1439 as Litnivtsi and was part of the Podolian Voivodeship of the Kingdom of Poland. From 1702–1703, Litnivtsi was granted the Magdeburg rights. It was a royal city of Poland. In 1829, Litnivtsi was renamed to "Nova Ushytsia" (New Ushytsia) to differentiate it with the town of Stara Ushytsia (Old Ushytsia). In 1924, the town was granted the status of an urban-type settlement after it became the Nova Ushytsia Raion's administrative center.

Until 18 July 2020, Nova Ushytsia was the administrative center of Nova Ushytsia Raion. The raion was abolished in July 2020 as part of the administrative reform of Ukraine, which reduced the number of raions of Khmelnytskyi Oblast to three. The area of Nova Ushytsia Raion was merged into Kamianets-Podilskyi Raion.

Climate

References

External links
 The murder of the Jews of Nova Ushytsia during World War II, at Yad Vashem website.

Urban-type settlements in Kamianets-Podilskyi Raion
Populated places established in the 1430s
Podolia Voivodeship
Ushitsky Uyezd
Holocaust locations in Ukraine